|}

The Roses Stakes is a Listed flat horse race in Great Britain open to two-year-old horses. It is run at York over a distance of 5 furlongs (1,006 metres), and it is scheduled to take place each year in August. It is currently held on the last day of York's four-day Ebor Festival meeting.

Winners since 1988

See also
 Horse racing in Great Britain
 List of British flat horse races

References
 Paris-Turf: 
, 
Racing Post

Flat races in Great Britain
York Racecourse
Flat horse races for two-year-olds